Events in the year 2018 in Jordan.

Incumbents
 Monarch – Abdullah II 
 Prime Minister – Hani Mulki

Events

29 January – the Royal Tank Museum opened in Amman.
 12 August - Jordanian forces raided a militant group in Al-Salt, Balqa Governorate, leading to the deaths of four security officials and three suspected militants.

Deaths

19 March – Fahed Fanek 83, economist.

6 May – Jamal Naji, novelist (b.1954)

6 November – Ina'am Al-Mufti, politician, Minister of Social Development (1979–1984) (b. 1929).

References

 
2010s in Jordan
Years of the 21st century in Jordan
Jordan
Jordan